MF EP is a split EP by rappers MF Doom and MF Grimm. It was released on November 28, 2000.

The song "Break Em Off" also appeared on MF Grimm's solo debut The Downfall of Ibliys: A Ghetto Opera.

Track listing
Tracks 1–3 performed by MF DOOM, tracks 4–7 performed by MF Grimm.

Personnel
Credits are adapted from the EP's liner notes.

Artwork
 Karma – art direction, design
 Ryan Murphy – photography

Additional personnel
 John C. DeFalco – executive production
 Truth Elemental – executive production
 Papi D – executive production

References

MF Doom albums
MF Grimm albums
2000 EPs
Split EPs